The M2 Mortar is a 60 millimeter smoothbore, muzzle-loading, high-angle-of-fire weapon used by U.S. forces in World War II, the Korean War, and the Vietnam War for light infantry support.

Description

The U.S. M2 60 mm mortar was licensed from French Brandt company to supplement 81 mm M1 Mortar to provide a lighter-weight alternative to company-level fire support.  The M2 attempted to bridge the gap between the 81 mm mortar and the hand grenade.  Normally employed by the weapons platoon of a U.S. infantry company, the M2 is of the usual mortar pattern of the day.  It consists of a smoothbore metal tube on a rectangular baseplate, supported by a simple bipod with the elevation and traverse mechanisms.  The firing pin was fixed in the base cap of the tube, and the bomb was fired automatically when it dropped down the barrel.  Though classed as a light mortar, the M2 had considerable range compared to the 50 mm and 60 mm mortars of most other nations, and its fixed-firing pin design allowed a high rate of fire by trained crews.

History
During the late 1920s, the US Army began examining mortars to act as a light infantry support weapon.  The War Department eventually settled on a 60 mm design from Edgar Brandt, a French ordnance engineer, and purchased a license to build the weapon.  The model was standardized as the Mortar, 60 mm M2.  Testing took place in the late 1930s, and the first order for 1,500 M2 mortars was placed in January 1940.

The weapon was used throughout World War II by the U.S. Army and U.S. Marine Corps.  It saw service again in the Korean War, and by French forces in their counterinsurgency campaigns in Indochina and Algeria.  It was used under designation m/952 by Portugal during the Portuguese Colonial War. During the Vietnam War, the M2 was again used by the U.S. Army and Marines, as well as by South Vietnamese forces. Ultimately, the M2 was replaced by the M224 in 1978.

Chinese variants 
China (the Republic of China prior to 1949) also locally produced the M2 mortar, which was designated as the Type 31. After the People's Republic of China was established in 1949, some Type 31s were supplied to North Korea and North Vietnam. It was later modified as the Type 63 and then as the Type 63-1 mortar. They are also supplied to Mujahideen rebels during Soviet-Afghan War by China and the US Central Intelligence Agency. The latter type has been produced under license by the Pakistan Machine Tool Factory Limited and by Helwan Machine Tools Company in Egypt.

Operation
Each mortar shell had a screw-on cap in its base. Inside the hollow in the tail, it contained a 20-gauge M5A1 Ignition Cartridge. This was a paper shotgun shell filled with ballistite powder.

The mortar had a firing pin in the bottom of the tube. When the shell was dropped down the tube, the firing pin struck the Ignition Cartridge in the shell's tail, detonating it. When the cartridge detonated, the explosive gases exited the base of the shell through two bleed holes. This propelled the shell out of the tube in an arc.

To increase the mortar's range, shells were issued with four waterproof cellophane bags of propellant, called increments, fastened to the stabilizing fins with wire clips. The ignition cartridge would ignite the propellant, increasing chamber pressure and the shell's muzzle velocity. To reduce the mortar's muzzle velocity, increment charges were removed as needed before firing. This allowed great flexibility in the angle at which shells impacted the target area, allowing the weapon to drop shells behind hills or buildings.

Ammunition

The M2 Mortar could fire several types of ammunition.
 M49A2 High explosive (HE) with Point Detonating fuze M52B1 [Weight: ]: An explosive shell used against infantry and other light area targets. It has a minimum range of  when fired without a boosting charge at a 70° angle and a maximum range of  when fired with four boosting charges at a 45° angle.
 M49A3 High Explosive Cartridge (HE) with Super-Quick Point Detonating fuze M525 [Weight: 3.05 lb (1.38 kg)]: Often referred to in the field as "HE quick".
 M302 White phosphorus Cartridge (WP): A "bursting smoke" shell used as a signaling, screening, smoke-producing, and casualty-producing shell.Unlike regular smoke shells of the period, which used a "hot" chemical reaction to generate a smoke cloud, the white phosphorus shell detonates to expose its filler to the air, causing it to spontaneously ignite and generate a thick cloud of white or grey smoke. It also sets combustible materials in its radius of effect on fire, causing secondary smoke sources. If personnel are hit by burning white phosphorus, the fragments will continue to burn inside the wound. They need to be evacuated to a hospital to have the fragments removed under special conditions.
 M83 Illuminating Cartridge (ILL): A pyrotechnic parachute flare shell used in night missions requiring illumination for assistance in observation.
 M69 Training/Practice Cartridge (TP) [Weight: 4.43 lb (2.01 kg)]: A shell with a cast iron body, inert filler, and detachable fin assembly used to train recruits in firing the M2 mortar. The cast iron body is reusable and the fin assembly can be replaced if damaged.
 M50A3 Training / Practice Cartridge (TP) [Weight 3.15 lb (1.43 kg)]: This practice shell is ballistically matched to the M49A4 HE shell, making it easier to train. They are the same size and weight, only differing in that the M50A3 is inert and emits a puff of white smoke on impact.

Users 

 
 
 
 : Type 63
 
 : Type 31, Type 63 and Type 63-1
 : designated m/51
: Type 63-1 produced under license.
 : used by the Kagnew Battalion
 
 
 

 : Type 63
 : Type 31
: The Armed Forces was equipped with 579 M2/M19s before the Korean War, and 2,263 were in service with the Army by the end of the war. Began replacing with KM19 in 1970s.

 : Type 63-1 produced under license.
 
 

 
 Type 31

: M2, Type 31 and Type 63

See also
 List of U.S. Army weapons by supply catalog designation
 M1 mortar
 M224 mortar - Replacement for the M2 in US service
 CM60A1
 Weapons of the Lebanese Civil War

References

 Hogg, Ian (2000). Twentieth-Century Artillery. Friedman/Fairfax Publishers. 
 Norris, John and Calow, Robert, Infantry Mortars of World War II, Osprey Publishing (2002),

External links
 Cover photo of M2 60mm mortar  May 1941 Popular Science

World War II mortars
Chemical weapon delivery systems
Infantry mortars
Mortars of the United States
World War II infantry weapons of the United States
World War II infantry weapons of China
Chemical weapons of the United States
60mm mortars
Weapons and ammunition introduced in 1940